Abhayamudra is a double live collaboration album by the American musical group Cul de Sac and Japanese vocalist Damo Suzuki, released on November 2, 2004 through Strange Attractors Audio House.

Track listing

Personnel 
Musicians
Robin Amos – Eml 101 synthesizer, harmonica, autoharp
Glenn Jones – guitar, bouzouki
Jonathan LaMaster – bass guitar, violin
Jon Proudman – drums
Damo Suzuki – vocals, production
Production and additional personnel
Matthew Azevedo – mastering
Lars Christensen – engineering
Cul de Sac – production
Jim Siegel – drums on "Kopenhagen 3"
Jake Trussell – bass guitar on "Cambridge 1"

References 

2004 live albums
Collaborative albums
Cul de Sac (band) albums